Antonio Ethan Gates Sr. (born June 18, 1980) is an American former professional football player who was a tight end for the San Diego / Los Angeles Chargers during his entire career in the National Football League (NFL). He was named to the Pro Bowl eight times and was a five-time All-Pro selection. He retired on January 14, 2020, after 16 years with the Chargers.

Gates was signed as an undrafted free agent in 2003 after playing college basketball for Kent State University.  He attended college at Kent State his junior and senior years after brief stints at Michigan State University and Eastern Michigan University. He is the Chargers' career leader in receptions, receiving yards, and receiving touchdowns. In 2015, he became the second tight end and ninth player overall to record 100 career touchdown receptions. He ranks seventh in career touchdown receptions, with 116, and leads all tight ends in NFL history. Gates is considered one of the best tight ends and undrafted free agents in NFL history.

Early years
Gates was born in Detroit, where he played high school football at Central High School.

College career
Gates played basketball but not football in college. He originally enrolled at Michigan State University wanting to play football under then-coach Nick Saban as well as basketball under coach Tom Izzo. Upon enrolling, he learned that Saban wanted him to play only football. Gates then chose to pursue playing basketball by transferring to Eastern Michigan University. He played there part of a season before transferring to the College of the Sequoias, a junior college in California, to focus on academics. Recruited by Stan Heath, Gates transferred to Kent State University in northeastern Ohio.

As a member of the Golden Flashes, Gates played two seasons as power forward. His junior season he averaged 16.0 points, 8.1 rebounds and 2.7 assists per game. His junior season his team won its first regular season Mid-American Conference (MAC) championship in school history after finishing the regular season with a 24–5 overall record with a 17–1 record in the MAC. Gates helped the Golden Flashes win their second consecutive MAC tournament and earn its resulting berth in the 2002 NCAA Tournament. In the tournament, he gave crucial performances that helped Kent State reach the Elite Eight as a 10 seed by upsetting 7 seed Oklahoma State (69–61), 2 seed Alabama (71–58) and 3 seed Pittsburgh (78–73).

During his senior season, he received honorable mention All-American honors from the Associated Press after averaging 20.6 points, 7.7 rebounds and 4.1 assists per game. He finished with a record of 54–16 in two years of playing.

His jersey number, 44, was retired on February 27, 2010, making him just the fourth Golden Flash to receive the honor.

Professional career
After being told by scouts that he was too much of a "tweener" to make the NBA, Gates arranged a workout in front of NFL scouts. Despite never having played college football, as many as 19 teams were believed to have contacted Gates about a tryout.  Gates chose to work out first for the San Diego Chargers. Recognizing his potential, the Chargers immediately signed him to a contract as an undrafted free agent.

2003 season
Lost in the disappointment of San Diego's league-worst 4–12 record was Gates' rise from third string to starter. He made his first catch in Week 4 against the Oakland Raiders, scored his first touchdown in Week 10 against the Minnesota Vikings, and enjoyed his first 100-yard receiving game against the Green Bay Packers in Week 15. After finishing a solid 2003 rookie season in which he caught 24 passes for 389 yards and two scores, Gates was picked by many experts to have a breakout season in 2004.  His 16.2 yards per reception were the longest of his career.

2004 season
A preferred target of quarterback Drew Brees, Gates finished his second season in the NFL with 81 receptions for 964 yards and 13 touchdowns.

On December 19, Gates tied the NFL single season record for touchdown receptions by a tight end (12) in a 21–0 win over the Cleveland Browns—he went on to break this record in an overtime loss to the Indianapolis Colts on December 26.

Gates was selected to the 2005 Pro Bowl and caught a touchdown pass from Colts' quarterback Peyton Manning to help the AFC to a 38–27 victory. Additionally, Gates was on the receiving end of a 33-yard pass from teammate Drew Brees in a flea-flicker play selected by fans online.

2005 season
On August 23, 2005, after holding out for a contract extension, Gates signed a six-year deal worth up to $24 million with the San Diego Chargers.  Because of his holdout, Gates was suspended for one game–the home opener against the Dallas Cowboys, a loss.  Gates went on to have another stellar season, catching 89 passes for 1,101 yards and 10 touchdowns, but the Chargers missed the playoffs by a single win.

2006 season
With the departure of Drew Brees during the offseason, it was assumed that Gates would suffer a decline in production in 2006, with first-year starter Philip Rivers at the helm.  Gates had a relatively quiet start to the season, but he finished the year strongly and ended up with 924 receiving yards and nine touchdowns. He caught two touchdown passes on December 10 against the Denver Broncos to help the Chargers clinch their division.

Gates was a Pro Bowler and All-Pro for the third straight year. Undefeated at Qualcomm during the regular season, the Chargers and their fans anticipated a trip to the Super Bowl but they were beaten by the New England Patriots at home by the score of 24–21.

2007 season
In 2007, Gates was not selected to the All Pro team but was selected to the Pro Bowl. During the season, he caught 75 passes for 984 yards and nine touchdowns. He was once again a key factor during the Chargers' 11–5 campaign, but not during the playoffs. Gates dislocated a toe on his right foot just before the postseason, which slowed him down during the Chargers' playoff run.

Gates was not the only Chargers star player injured: both LaDainian Tomlinson and Philip Rivers had leg injuries which hindered the Chargers' chances of reaching the Super Bowl. However, the Chargers did eventually  play in the AFC Championship, which they  lost 21–12 to the  Patriots.

2008 season

Gates said he was leaning toward having surgery to repair a dislocated left big toe that slowed his performance during the 2007–08 NFL playoffs, but was undecided on whether to have surgery or not, "There is higher chance I'm going to have surgery". Gates also pulled out of his fifth Pro Bowl selection because of his injuries alongside his teammate LaDainian Tomlinson. Gates finished the season with 60 receptions for 704 yards and eight touchdowns.

On February 23, 2008, Gates said he would have foot surgery to fix the injury that had slowed him in the final part of the season. He would face a 4–6 month recovery time. Gates seemed questionable for Week 1 and even sounded worried about his status for the opening day of the 2008 season; however, he ended up playing every game despite complaints that his toe was bothering him during the first half of the season. He finished the season with 60 receptions for 704 yards and eight touchdowns.

2009 season
Finally healthy after consecutive injury-plagued seasons, Gates enjoyed the finest year of his career. He caught 79 passes for a career-high 1,157 yards and eight touchdowns. He hauled in at least five passes in 10 of the team's first 11 games.

The team finished the year with 13 wins, one of the best records of the year. However, they were eliminated in their first postseason game by the New York Jets.

2010 season
Gates began the 2010 season by signing a five-year, $36 million contract with $20 million guaranteed. In the first nine games of the 2010 season, he had 40 receptions and nine touchdowns.

Despite being limited by foot injuries throughout the second half of the 2010  season, Gates earned a Pro Bowl selection for his seventh consecutive year; however, as a result of his lingering injuries, Gates did not participate in the game.

2011 season
Gates tried to play through his chronic foot problems but was forced to sit out Weeks 3–5. He came back after the bye week and started every game the rest of the way, finishing with more than 60 catches (64) for the seventh time in his career. He also scored seven touchdowns and was voted into his eighth Pro Bowl. Gates became the Chargers' all-time receptions leader on a six-yard catch on a fourth-and-5, early in the fourth quarter against Detroit. It was his 587th career catch, surpassing Charlie Joiner's 586.

2012 season
Gates had another record-breaking season, becoming the fifth tight end in NFL history with 600 career catches and runner-up for most touchdowns in Chargers franchise history with 83. The tight end and his quarterback Philip Rivers connected for a total of 56 touchdown catches, the most out of any QB-tight end combination in the NFL.

2013 season
Gates played all 16 games for the first time since 2009, finishing with 70 receptions (77) for the fourth time in his career. However, Gates only scored four touchdowns, his fewest since his rookie season in 2003.

2014 season
Gates passed Lance Alworth to become the Chargers' career leader in receiving yards in Week 7 against the Broncos. In the season's final game against the Kansas City Chiefs, he became the fourth tight end in NFL history to surpass 10,000 yards in career receiving yards. He finished the season with 12 touchdowns, becoming the fourth player in league history to catch 12 or more touchdowns in a season at age 34. His teammates voted him the Chargers' Offensive Player of the Year and he was invited as an alternate for the Pro Bowl, but declined.

2015 season
On July 2, 2015, it was announced that Gates would be suspended for the first four games of the 2015 season for violating the NFL's rules on performance enhancing drugs (PEDs). On October 12, 2015, in his first game back after from a four-game suspension, Gates scored his 100th and 101st career touchdown receptions. He would finish the season with 630 yards and five touchdowns on 56 receptions. On March 9, 2016, Gates signed a two-year contract extension to remain with the Chargers.

2016 season
Gates played in 14 games in 2016, starting nine.  He caught 53 passes for 538 yards and scored seven touchdowns.  His 10.3 yards per reception and 57% completion percentage were the lowest of his career.

2017 season
In Week 2, against the Miami Dolphins, he caught his 112th career touchdown pass, which set a new NFL record for most touchdowns as a tight end. Following the emergence of second-year tight end Hunter Henry as a starter, Gates only started four games and finished with 30 receptions for a career-low 316 yards and three touchdowns.

On April 27, 2018, the Chargers informed Gates they would not be bringing him back for the 2018 season.

2018 season
On September 2, 2018, Gates re-signed with the Los Angeles Chargers following an injury to Hunter Henry. In Week 4, against the San Francisco 49ers, he scored his first receiving touchdown of the season.

Retirement
Gates announced his retirement on January 14, 2020. He ended his career with a record 116 touchdown catches by a tight end, including 89 thrown by Rivers for the most ever by a quarterback–tight end duo at the time. He also finished as the Chargers' franchise leader in receptions (955) and receiving yards (11,841).

In 2020, Gates announced he was joining the Los Angeles Chargers front office as Legends Ambassador.

Records and awards
 Seventh tight end with 500 career receptions.
 Number 44 retired by Kent State.
 Ninth player, and second tight end, to catch 100 career receiving touchdowns.
 Most career touchdowns by a tight end (116)

NFL career statistics

Personal life
Gates married his longtime girlfriend, model Sasha Dindayal, on July 9, 2011. As of 2014, the couple resided in Encino, California.

Gates appeared in the fourth episode of season one and the final episode of season six of The League.

Gates has a son, Antonio Gates Jr., who is (as of 2022) a freshman wide receiver for the Michigan State Spartans.

Gates appeared on the 2/6/2023 episode of The Bachelor (American TV series).

Notes

References

External links

 Antonio Gates at Chargers.com
 Antonio Gates at NFL.com
 Antonio Gates at Pro-Football-Reference.com
 ESPN.Com Kent State basketball statistics

1980 births
Living people
African-American basketball players
African-American players of American football
American Conference Pro Bowl players
American football tight ends
American men's basketball players
Basketball players from Detroit
Basketball players from San Diego
Central High School (Detroit) alumni
Eastern Michigan Eagles men's basketball players
Kent State Golden Flashes men's basketball players
Los Angeles Chargers players
Players of American football from Detroit
Players of American football from San Diego
San Diego Chargers players
21st-century African-American sportspeople
20th-century African-American people
10,000 receiving yards club